Andrew 'Andy' Peter Austin (born 31 January 1956 in Sawbridgeworth) is a British sport shooter.

Sport shooting career
Austin competed at the 1992 Summer Olympics in the mixed skeet event, in which he tied for 21st place.

He represented England and won a silver medal in the skeet pairs with Ken Harman and a bronze medal in the individual skeet, at the 1990 Commonwealth Games in Auckland, New Zealand. Four years later he won a bronze medal in the skeet at the 1994 Commonwealth Games and at the 1998 Commonwealth Games he won his fourth medal after securing another silver in the skeet pairs with Drew Harvey.

References

1956 births
Living people
Skeet shooters
British male sport shooters
Shooters at the 1992 Summer Olympics
Olympic shooters of Great Britain
Commonwealth Games medallists in shooting
Commonwealth Games silver medallists for England
Commonwealth Games bronze medallists for England
People from Sawbridgeworth
Shooters at the 1990 Commonwealth Games
Shooters at the 1994 Commonwealth Games
Shooters at the 1998 Commonwealth Games
20th-century British people
Medallists at the 1990 Commonwealth Games
Medallists at the 1994 Commonwealth Games
Medallists at the 1998 Commonwealth Games